Ruth Oliver may refer to:

 Ruth Law Oliver (1887–1970), American aviator
 Ruth Hale Oliver (1910–1988), American astrologer